Enrico Luis Victor "Paco" Santos Arespacochaga (born 21 July 1971) is a musician and songwriter. He is the drummer of the Filipino pop-rock band Introvoys. Aside from receiving numerous Gold and Multi-Platinum awards, he also received the Guillermo Mendoza Award. Since 1995, he has been a Zildjian endorser.

Introvoys (1986-1996)
Arespacochaga was one of the founding members of Introvoys along with 3rd-G Cristobal and Jonathan Buencamino. Introvoys albums shot to quadruple platinum status earning the band the label “the No. 1 Band in the Land!”. In 1994 they released an album, Line to Heaven, in which Paco sang the title song which he had composed after losing both his parents. In 1996, Arespacochaga left the band.

Mystery (1997-2000)
Arespacochaga formed Mystery in 1997. The line up was Marvin Yrastorza on vocals, Joseph Cruz on keyboards, G3 Misa on guitar, Mark Cruz on bass and Paco on drums. They released the album Jigsaw under Star Records.

Skin (2000-2001)
Arespacochaga formed Skin in 2000. The line up was Norby David on vocals, Jonathan Manuel on guitar, Henry Abesamis on keyboards, and Paco on drums.

Solo Album (2000)
In 2000, Arespacochaga released his solo album entitled Rebirth.

Introvoys (2001-present)
Arespacochaga reunited with Introvoys and they had a US tour. After the tour, he decided to migrate to Los Angeles, California as did the rest of the band. Their single "Nasaan Ka?" was released in June 2014.

Personal life
Arespacochaga is married to Janelle Aguirre and currently reside in California with their children.

See also
Introvoys
Introgirls

References

External links
 Paco's Facebook Page

1971 births
Filipino rock musicians
Living people
Musicians from Manila
De La Salle University alumni
Filipino songwriters
Filipino expatriates in the United States
Filipino people of Basque descent